Goodenia varia, commonly known as sticky goodenia, is a species of flowering plant in the family Goodeniaceae and is endemic to southern Australia. It is an ascending to prostrate shrub with elliptic leaves, usually with toothed edges, and racemes or thyrses of yellow flowers.

Description

Taxonomy
Goodenia varia was first formally described in 1810 by Robert Brown in Prodromus Florae Novae Hollandiae. The specific epithet (varia) means "variable", referring to the shape of the leaves.

Distribution and habitat
Sticky goodenia grows in Triodia grassland, woodland, mallee and coastal communities from Eucla in Western Australia and eastwards to south-eastern South Australia, north-western Victoria and far south-western New South Wales.

References

varia
Flora of New South Wales
Flora of Western Australia
Flora of South Australia
Asterales of Australia
Plants described in 1810
Taxa named by Robert Brown (botanist, born 1773)